Martin Hinterstocker (born 3 September 1989) is a German professional ice hockey forward who currently plays for the Straubing Tigers in the Deutsche Eishockey Liga (DEL). He joined the Augsburger Panther from EHC Red Bull München during the 2014–15 season. He then signed as a free agent to a one-year deal with the Straubing Tigers on 3 June 2015.

Career statistics

Regular season and playoffs

International

References

External links

1989 births
Living people
Augsburger Panther players
DEG Metro Stars players
EHC München players
Sportspeople from Garmisch-Partenkirchen
German ice hockey left wingers